An expert is someone widely recognized as a reliable source of technique or skill.

Expert or EXPERT may also refer to:

Science and technology
 Expert (company), a Swiss consumer electronics retail chain
 Gradiente Expert, the second and last MSX home computer launched in the Brazilian market
 European eXPErimental Re-entry Testbed (EXPERT), a European Space Agency research programme

Other uses
 Expert (magazine), a Russian weekly business magazine
 Peugeot Expert, a model of light commercial vehicle

See also
 The Expert (disambiguation)
 Expert system, in artificial intelligence
 Expert witness, a person whose opinion is accepted by the judge as an expert